Numalgun Land District is a land district (cadastral division) of Western Australia, located within the Kimberley Land Division in the Kimberley region of the state.

Location and features
The district is located inland in the Shire of Wyndham-East Kimberley and north-east of the Wunaamin-Miliwundi Ranges. It contains most of the Gibb River Station.

History
Numalgun was gazetted on 13 June 1906.

References

Land districts of Western Australia